Lægerneset (English: Camp Point) is a headland on the eastern side of Recherche Fjord, Svalbard. It was once known as "Whale Head" or "Edge's Point", which was named after the English merchant and whaler Thomas Edge. An English whaling station was situated on the point in the first half of the 17th century.

References

 Norwegian Polar Institute: Place names in Norwegian polar areas

Whaling stations in Norway
1615 establishments in Norway
Peninsulas of Spitsbergen
Former populated places in Svalbard
Whaling in Norway
Whaling in the United Kingdom